Stormtrooper Families: Homosexuality and Community in the Early Nazi Movement (2015) is a book by the American historian Andrew Wackerfuss. It focuses on Nazism and homosexuality and received generally favorable reviews. The book was published by Harrington Park Press.

References

Further reading

2015 non-fiction books
Books about LGBT history
Books about Nazi Germany
Sturmabteilung
Harrington Park Press books
LGBT in Nazi Germany
2010s LGBT literature